Clementine Plessner (7 December 1855 – 27 February 1943) was an Austrian stage and film actress. Plessner worked in the German film industry and appeared in over sixty films, mostly during the silent era. Plessner featured in Richard Oswald's enlightenment film Different from the Others and F.W. Murnau's Journey into the Night.

Following the Nazi rise to power, the Jewish actress left Germany for neighbouring Austria. Later, after the Anchluss, she was arrested by the Nazi authorities and died in Theresienstadt concentration camp.

Selected filmography
 Diary of a Lost Woman (1918)
 The Story of Dida Ibsen (1918)
 Henriette Jacoby (1918)
 Different from the Others (1919)
 Nocturne of Love (1919)
 The Tragedy of a Great (1920)
 Humanity Unleashed (1920)
 Lady Hamilton (1921)
 Journey into the Night (1921)
 The Shadow of Gaby Leed (1921)
 The Circle of Death (1922)
 Bigamy (1922)
 Lucrezia Borgia (1922)
 Hallig Hooge (1923)
 Taras Bulba (1924)
 Gobseck (1924)
 Girls You Don't Marry (1924)
 Slaves of Love (1924)
 The Voice of the Heart (1924)
 Two Children (1924)
 The Circus Princess (1925)
 The Iron Bride (1925)
 Oh Those Glorious Old Student Days (1925)
 The Clever Fox (1926)
 Superfluous People (1926)
 The Bank Crash of Unter den Linden (1926)
 Only a Dancing Girl (1926)
 Mademoiselle Josette, My Woman (1926)
 The Eleven Schill Officers (1926)
 The Captain from Koepenick (1926)
 The Right to Live (1927)
 The White Sonata (1928)
 The Missing Wife (1929)
 Der Monte Christo von Prag (1929)
 Devotion (1929)

References

Bibliography
 Eisner, Lotte H. F. W. Murnau. University of California Press, 1973. 
 Prawer, S.S. Between Two Worlds: The Jewish Presence in German and Austrian Film, 1910–1933. Berghahn Books, 2005.

External links

1855 births
1943 deaths
Austrian Jews
Austrian stage actresses
Austrian film actresses
Austrian silent film actresses
Actresses from Vienna
20th-century Austrian actresses
Austrian people who died in the Theresienstadt Ghetto